MDR Life was a German, public radio station owned and operated by the Mitteldeutscher Rundfunk (MDR).

References

Mitteldeutscher Rundfunk
Defunct radio stations in Germany
Radio stations established in 1992
Radio stations disestablished in 1999
1992 establishments in Germany
1999 disestablishments in Germany
Mass media in Leipzig